The 2012 season was the Minnesota Vikings' 52nd in the National Football League, as well as their second full season under head coach Leslie Frazier. They looked to improve upon their 3–13 season the year before, and did so after defeating the Tennessee Titans in Week 5; their win over the Houston Texans in Week 16 made this their first winning season since 2009. The Vikings also made the playoffs for the first time since 2009 with a Week 17 win over the Green Bay Packers to give them a 10–6 regular season record, but were defeated by the same opponents in the Wild Card playoff round the following week. Adrian Peterson was named the league's Most Valuable Player after rushing for 2,097 yards, just nine yards short of breaking the single-season record held by Eric Dickerson since 1984.

On May 10, 2012, the Minnesota State Legislature approved a bill for a new stadium for the team that would see a new facility (later named U.S. Bank Stadium) constructed by 2016 and ensure the Vikings' presence in Minneapolis through the year 2046. The bill was signed by Governor Mark Dayton on May 14, and approved by the Minneapolis City Council by a vote of 7–6 on May 25.

Offseason

Pre-draft transactions
The first major transactions of the 2012 offseason were the releases of veteran guards Steve Hutchinson and Anthony Herrera, and CB Cedric Griffin on March 10, as the Vikings began rebuilding their offensive line and secondary. Three days later, the team re-signed perennial backup QB Sage Rosenfels and DT Letroy Guion off their unrestricted free agents list. This was followed up with the signing of the Seattle Seahawks' unrestricted free agent TE John Carlson on a five-year contract.

The next week, the team brought in FB Jerome Felton, also an unrestricted free agent, from the Indianapolis Colts. They then released DT Remi Ayodele on March 21, but re-signed DT Fred Evans. March 26 was a big day for signings by the Vikings, with the re-signings of WR Devin Aromashodu and LB Erin Henderson, as well as the free agent acquisitions of CB Zack Bowman from the Chicago Bears and T Geoff Schwartz from the Carolina Panthers.

April saw very few transactions go through in anticipation of the 2012 NFL Draft at the end of the month. Nevertheless, the Vikings signed LB Marvin Mitchell and WR Jerome Simpson, despite the fact that Simpson would miss the first three games of the season for a violation of the NFL's substance abuse policy.

Draft

Notes:
 Cleveland traded their first-round selection (4th overall), fourth-round selection (118th overall), fifth-round selection (139th overall), and seventh-round selection (211th overall) to move up one spot to the third overall selection and draft RB Trent Richardson.
 Minnesota traded their second-round selection (35th overall) and fourth-round selection (98th overall) to Baltimore to move up six spots to 29th overall selection and make this pick.
 Minnesota was awarded two compensatory picks for the loss of free agents Ray Edwards, Ben Leber, Tarvaris Jackson, and Sidney Rice.
 Detroit traded their seventh-round selection (219th overall) and 2013 fourth-round selection (102nd overall) to Minnesota for their fifth-round selection (138th overall) and the seventh-round selection (223rd overall) that they received from New England in the trade for Randy Moss in 2010.
 Minnesota traded their sixth-round selection (173rd overall) to Washington for QB Donovan McNabb.
 Cleveland traded their sixth-round selection (175th overall) to Minnesota in exchange for DE Jayme Mitchell.
 Tennessee traded their 2013 sixth-round selection (176th overall) to Minnesota for the seventh-round selection (211th overall) that they received in the first-round trade with Cleveland. Minnesota later traded the pick they received from Tennessee to the Arizona Cardinals in exchange for a seventh-round pick and CB A. J. Jefferson.

Post-draft transactions
With the 2012 Draft over, the Vikings resumed their transactions in May, signing a number of undrafted free agents to their roster, and releasing RB Caleb King, following a short jail term. With the drafting of Blair Walsh, veteran kicker Ryan Longwell found himself surplus to requirements for the Vikings and he was released on May 7. By the start of June, all of the Vikings draft selections (with the exception of T Matt Kalil) had been signed to long-term contracts.

Preseason

Schedule
This was the first year the Vikings used a TV/radio simulcast for their preseason games.

Game summaries

Week 1: at San Francisco 49ers

Week 2: vs. Buffalo Bills

Week 3: vs. San Diego Chargers

Week 4: at Houston Texans

Regular season

Schedule

Team names in bold indicate Vikings' home games.

Game summaries

Week 1: vs. Jacksonville Jaguars

Week 2: at Indianapolis Colts

Week 3: vs. San Francisco 49ers

Week 4: at Detroit Lions

Week 5: vs. Tennessee Titans

Week 6: at Washington Redskins

Week 7: vs. Arizona Cardinals

Week 8: vs. Tampa Bay Buccaneers

Week 9: at Seattle Seahawks

Week 10: vs. Detroit Lions

Week 12: at Chicago Bears

Week 13: at Green Bay Packers

Week 14: vs. Chicago Bears

Week 15: at St. Louis Rams

Week 16: at Houston Texans

Week 17: vs. Green Bay Packers

Adrian Peterson rushed for 199 yards, coming up nine yards short of breaking the single season record by Eric Dickerson. This included five rushes for 36 yards on the final drive to set up the winning field goal by Blair Walsh. This game was rated #3 on the Top 20 NFL Games of 2012 on NFL.com as AP2K.

Standings

Postseason

Schedule

Game summaries

NFC Wild Card Round: at Green Bay Packers

Having secured the NFC's #6 seed, the Vikings traveled to Lambeau Field for a rematch with the Packers. With the two teams meeting in the playoffs for only the second time ever, Blair Walsh capped the game's opening drive with a field goal to put the Vikings 3–0 up. However, the Packers then scored 24 unanswered points to take a 24–3 lead in the 3rd quarter. The Vikings tried to rally a comeback with a touchdown to make it 24–10, but it was too little, too late as time ran out for Minnesota.

Statistics

Team leaders

Vikings single season record.

League rankings

Pro Bowl
Four Minnesota Vikings players were selected for the 2013 Pro Bowl: two on offense (running back partners Adrian Peterson and Jerome Felton), one on defense (DE Jared Allen) and one special teamer (K Blair Walsh). Of these, Peterson, Felton and Walsh were selected as starters, with Allen going as a reserve.

With the withdrawal of Dallas Cowboys LB DeMarcus Ware on January 10 because of a shoulder injury, Vikings LB Chad Greenway was called up to the NFC roster as a replacement. TE Kyle Rudolph was also added to the NFC roster for his first Pro Bowl two weeks later after Atlanta Falcons TE Tony Gonzalez dropped out due to injury. Rookie Matt Kalil was also added later as a replacement for the Washington Redskins' tackle, Trent Williams, yet another casualty of injury. Rudolph was named the game's MVP.

Staff

Roster

Notes and references

External links
Minnesota Vikings official website
2012 Minnesota Vikings at ESPN
2012 Minnesota Vikings at Pro Football Reference

Minnesota
Minnesota Vikings seasons
Minnesota